Mallol is a surname. Notable people with the surname include:
Lorenç Mallol (fl. 1350), Cataln poet
Maria Teresa Ferrer i Mallol (1940-2017), Catalan historian
Tomàs Mallol (born 1923), Catalan film-maker whose collection formed the basis of the Museum of Cinema-Tomàs Mallol collection in Girona